Spartaco Cesaretti (19 January 1921 – 28 February 1984) was a Sammarinese former sports shooter. He competed in the 50 metre pistol event at the 1960 Summer Olympics.

References

External links
 

1921 births
1984 deaths
Sammarinese male sport shooters
Olympic shooters of San Marino
Shooters at the 1960 Summer Olympics